Accent Records is a Belgian record label started in 1978 by Adelheid and Andreas Glatt, releasing classical music from between 1500 AD and the 20th century, but primarily from the 17th and 18th centuries.

Artists having recorded for Accent Records include 
 Luc Devos (fortepiano)
 Paul Dombrecht (oboe, leader)
 Roel Dieltiens (violoncello)
 René Jacobs (countertenor)
 Konrad Junghänel (lute)
 Robert Kohnen (harpsichord)
 Sigiswald Kuijken (violin, viola da gamba, leader)
 Barthold Kuijken (flute)
 Wieland Kuijken (violoncello, viola da gamba)
 Marcel Ponseele (oboe)
 Raphaella Smits (guitar)
 Liuwe Tamminga (organ)
 Jos van Immerseel (fortepiano)
 Erik Van Nevel with Currende (vocal and instrumental ensemble)
 La Petite Bande (ensemble)
 La Colombina (ensemble)
 Concerto Palatino (ensemble)

See also 
 List of record labels

External links
 Official site

Belgian record labels
Record labels established in 1978
Classical music record labels